Oni-Con is an annual three-day anime convention held during October/November at the Galvestion Island Convention Center at The San Luis Resort in Galveston, Texas. The name of the convention comes from, "oni", the Japanese word for "demon/ogre".

Features
The convention typically offers anime rooms, art show and auction, concerts, contests, a dance, a dealer's room, demonstrations, industry guests, LARP, masquerade, panels, video games, and voice actors.

History
The convention was started by members of an Mallets, Etc., a Houston-based Anime Club. Oni-Con 2004 was held at the Sheraton North Houston at George Bush Intercontinental. The convention in its first year had an expected attendance of 1,200, but ended up with more than 3,000 attending. Oni-Con 2005 was held at the Park Plaza, Reliant Center. In 2006, Oni-Con had a dispute with the Grand Plaza Hotel in Houston. Oni-Cons 2006, 2007 and 2008 were held at the George R. Brown Convention Center. Oni-Con 2009 and 2010 was held at the Houston Marriott Westchase. For 2011, Oni-Con moved to Galveston, Texas and was held at the Galveston Island Convention Center. Oni-Con 2020 was cancelled due to the COVID-19 pandemic. The convention started a fundraiser in July 2020 for voice actor Chris Ayres, who was suffering from serious health issues.

Event history

Oni-Con Hawaii 
Oni-Con Hawaii was a three-day anime convention held during November at the Hawaii Convention Center in Honolulu, Hawaii. It was created by Oni-Con and Babel Entertainment, growing out of the defunct Hawaii Entertainment Expo (HEXXP). The convention featured a combined artist alley/dealers room (marketplace), host club and maid cafe, tabletop gaming, and video games. Communication issues affected the convention including cancelled panels and running out of lanyards. The convention chair of Oni-Con Hawaii 2014 stated that they did not receive the necessary resources from Oni-Con. He also knew nothing of the conventions 2014 plans.

Event history

References

Other Related News Articles
'It's an experience you can’t really find anywhere else' Galveston County The Daily News, Retrieved 21 November 2021

External links
Oni-Con Website

Anime conventions in the United States
Recurring events established in 2004
2004 establishments in Texas
Annual events in Texas
Conventions in Texas
Festivals in Texas
Japanese-American culture in Texas
Culture of Galveston, Texas
Tourist attractions in Galveston, Texas